Lewis Graulich (July 17, 1863 – May 3, 1934) was an American professional baseball first baseman and catcher. He played in the minor leagues from 1887 to 1892.

External links

1863 births
1934 deaths
19th-century baseball players
Baseball first basemen
Oswego Starchboxes players
Hazleton Pugilists players
Peoria Distillers players
Harrisburg Ponies players
Scranton Indians players
Wilkes-Barre Coal Barons players
Baseball players from Philadelphia